Pungro–Kiphire Assembly constituency is one of the 60 Legislative Assembly constituencies of Nagaland state in India.

It is part of Kiphire District and is reserved for candidates belonging to the Scheduled Tribes.

Members of the Legislative Assembly 

^ by-poll

Election results

2018

See also 
 List of constituencies of the Nagaland Legislative Assembly
 Kiphire district

References 

Kiphire district
Assembly constituencies of Nagaland